Ray Wesley Lucas (October 2, 1908 in Springfield, Ohio – October 9, 1969 in Harrison, Michigan) was a major league baseball pitcher, and a minor league baseball manager and scout.

Lucas pitched in the major leagues during parts of five different seasons for the New York Giants and the Brooklyn Dodgers. He compiled a record of 1–1 in twenty-two games, with one save and a 5.79 ERA. At the plate, Lucas went three for nine for a .333 lifetime batting average.

Lucas had some managerial stints in the minor leagues including part of a season with the Kinston Eagles. He pitched in the minors from 1929 to 1941. Lucas' best seasons were his last two when he went 37–22 in the West Texas–New Mexico League. His career was cut short after his hand was shot off in a hunting accident.

Following his playing days, Lucas scouted for the Toledo Mud Hens.

Sources

 

1908 births
1969 deaths
Brooklyn Dodgers players
New York Giants (NL) players
Major League Baseball pitchers
Baseball players from Ohio
Sportspeople from Springfield, Ohio
Minor league baseball managers
San Francisco Giants scouts
Toledo Mud Hens players
Newark Bears (IL) players
Bridgeport Bears (baseball) players
Buffalo Bisons (minor league) players
Mission Reds players
Seattle Indians players